The Palm Aphid, (Cerataphis brasiliensis), is an aphid in the superfamily Aphidoidea in the order Hemiptera. It is a true bug and sucks sap from plants.

Host plants
 Styrax benzoin
 Cocos nucifera
 Phoenix dactylifera
 Livistona chinensis
 Ptychosperma elegans
 Washingtonia robusta

References 

 
 
 
 
 
 
 

Hormaphidinae
Agricultural pest insects
Hemiptera of Australia
Insects described in 1901